Georgios Aliprantis (1880 – 31 July 1943) was a Greek gymnast who won the rope climbing event at the 1906 Intercalated Games in Athens, Greece.

Career
Aliprantis won the rope climbing event at the 1906 Intercalated Games in Athens, Greece. The event consisted of climbing up a  rope in the fastest time, and Aliprantis' time of 11.4 seconds was 2.4 seconds quicker than Hungary's Béla Erödy, who finished second. At the Games, Aliprantis also competed in the Individual all-around, 5 events competition, finishing fifth. The event was won by France's Pierre Payssé. In addition to his gold medal, Georgios was awarded a Hermes statue, and a second Hermes statue was awarded to his brother .

Personal life
Georgios Aliprantis was born in Istanbul, Ottoman Empire. His brother Nikolaos was also a gymnast, who also competed at the 1906 Intercalated Games.

References

Greek male artistic gymnasts
Medalists at the 1906 Intercalated Games
Sportspeople from Istanbul
1880 births
1943 deaths
Constantinopolitan Greeks
Gymnasts at the 1906 Intercalated Games
Emigrants from the Ottoman Empire to Greece